The Elbert County School District is a public school district in Elbert County, Georgia, United States. It serves the communities of Bowman and Elberton.

Schools
The Elbert County School District has three elementary schools, one middle school, one high school, and one alternative school.

Elementary schools
Blackwell Learning Centre (Head Start and Pre-Kindergarten) 
Elbert County Primary School (Grades K-1)
Elbert County Elementary School (Grades 2-4)

Middle school
Elbert County Middle School (Grades 5-8)

High school
Elbert County High School

Alternative school
Elberton Education Center (Grades 6-12)

References

External links

School districts in Georgia (U.S. state)
Education in Elbert County, Georgia